was an American animator and film director with a long career working in numerous countries. Among his best-known works are the animated adaptations of the Raymond Briggs books When the Wind Blows and The Snowman. He was nominated for an Academy Award for Best Animated Short Film for  The Magic Pear Tree (1968).

Early life 
On June 5, 1933, Murakami was born in San Jose, California. At age 9, following the signing of Executive Order 9066, Murakami was interned with his Japanese-American family at the Tule Lake War Relocation Center, a concentration camp in northern California. After the end of World War II, Murakami and his family settled in Los Angeles, California.

Education 
Murakami attended Chouinard Art Institute in Los Angeles.

Career 
In 1955, Murakami was an animator at UPA in Burbank. Murakami worked on the Boing Boing Show.

Following a short stint with Toei Animation in Tokyo, Murakami joined TVC in London in 1960. He returned to Los Angeles in 1965, and established Murakami Wolf Productions.  Murakami then moved to Ireland in 1971 and established Quarteru Films.

Murakami formed Murakami-Wolf Films with Fred Wolf.  He also directed the music video for "King of the Mountain", the single from Kate Bush's album Aerial.  In 1989, with his former partner Fred Wolf, he established Murakami Wolf Dublin to produce the hit animation series Teenage Mutant Ninja Turtles.

He also worked on 3 films for Roger Corman in the 70s-80s, including directing Battle Beyond The Stars, as well as Les pêcheurs de perles for Pascavision in 1993.

Murakami was the subject of a 2010 feature documentary film made by Irish director Sé Merry Doyle and produced by Martina Durac and Vanessa Gildea of Loopline Films called Jimmy Murakami - Non Alien which premiered in Dublin at the 2010 IFI Stranger than Fiction Film Festival.

Personal life 
Murakami died at the age of 80 on February 16, 2014, in Dublin, Ireland.  He was survived by his wife, Ethna and their two daughters.

Filmography

References

External links
 
Murakami's filmography

American animated film directors
1933 births
2014 deaths
Animators from California
American film directors of Japanese descent
Artists from San Jose, California
Film directors from California
Japanese-American internees